Tazewell County is the name of two counties in the United States:

 Tazewell County, Illinois
 Tazewell County, Virginia